Douglas Leedy (March 3, 1938; Portland, Oregon – March 28, 2015; Corvallis, Oregon) was an American composer, performer and music scholar.

Biography
Born in Portland, Oregon, Leedy studied with Karl Kohn at Pomona College and at the University of California, Berkeley, where he was in a composition seminar with membership including La Monte Young and Terry Riley. An orchestral hornist, harpsichordist, and singer, he studied South Indian music in Madras with K. V. Narayanaswamy, North Indian vocal music with Pandit Pran Nath, and was first music director of the Portland Baroque Orchestra and the musical director of the 1985 Portland Handel Festival, during which he conducted complete, period-instrument performances of Handel's oratorios Jephtha and Theodora. He taught music at UCLA, the Centro Simon Bolivar (Caracas), and at Reed College. He founded the electronic music studio at UCLA, and his synthesized music was among the earliest commissioned album-length recordings of the Moog Synthesizer and Buchla Synthesizer. The triple album Entropical Paradise was both the first triple album of synthesized "musical environments"—perhaps the first recording of explicitly ambient music—and featured modular analog synthesizer patches that, once set, played without further intervention by the performer. (Excerpts from Entropical Paradise were also included in the soundtrack album to the film Slaughterhouse Five as atmospheric complements to the music by Bach that had been featured in the actual Glenn Gould-produced soundtrack).

Although briefly composing in an atonal, but not strictly serial, style, Leedy's music is predominantly melodic and modal. His music includes theatrical and spatial or environmental elements (Exhibition Music, Decay) and has deep relationships to early music (The Leaves be Green, Symphoniae Sacrae). He explored the relationship, in classical Greek and Latin, between text and music. In general, his music exhibits a lyrical, melodic style, and connects, through its use of modality, repetition, and intonation, to the same radical reassessment of musical materials and musical history underlying the movement that came to be known as minimalism, led by his colleagues Young and Riley. Following his studies in early Western music and Indian music, and following the same musical path as his west coast American models, Harry Partch and Lou Harrison, Leedy made a decisive turn away from 12-tone equal temperament. He was a scholar of tuning systems and composed for keyboard instruments in historical meantone temperament and in various systems of Just intonation. He also proposed reconstructions of ancient Greek music, and prepared, on historical-theoretic principles, settings for musical performance of Homer, Sappho, Pindar, and the Persai (The Persians) of Aeschylus.

Principal works include: Trio (1960) fl, hn, pf. Perspectives (1964) hn. Quintet 1964 cl, bn, tp, db, org. Antifonia (1965) 2tp,2tb. Decay (1965) theatre piece. Music for Percussion (1965) theatre piece. Usable Music for Very Small Instruments with Holes (1966). Usable Music II in B♭, (1966) chamber ensemble. 88 is Great (1969) pf 18 hands, Dulces exuviae (Dido's Lament after Virgil) (1969) ssaattbb. Teddy Bears Picnic (1969) theatre piece. Gloria (1970) s, satb, orch. Sebastian (1971–74) chamber opera. Music for Meantone Harpsichord (1974–86). Canti (1975) cb solo with fl, va, gui, mar, vib. Symphoniae sacrae (1976) ms, viola da gamba, hps. Hymns (Rg Veda)(1982) chorus, gamelan. Pastorale (1987) setting of an Ode of Horace for chorus and retuned piano in Just Intonation, four hands. Three Symphonies (1993) orch. without conductor, Piano Sonata 1994. Is This a Great Country, or What? (1995) multimedia. Hiroshima–Nagasaki 1945–2005 for tuned bowls or bells, crotales (2005).

From 2003, most of his music appeared under the name Bhishma Xenotechnites, including not only his settings for voices and instruments (in Greek) of Homeric Hymns and other Greek and Latin lyrics but also such obviously anti-Western works as Ein kleines Wagner Notizbuch (2005), a collage of emasculated Wagner quotations for the same ensemble as his 1965 octet Quaderno Rossiniano, and H5N1 (2006) for extremely high-pitched instruments or whistlers and antique cymbals.

Discography
The Electric Zodiac (1969, Capitol)
A Very Merry Electric Christmas to You!  (1969, Capitol)
Entropical Paradise (1971, Seraphim)

References

"Leedy, Douglas" in The New Grove Dictionary of Music
"Leedy, Douglas" in Baker's Biographical Dictionary of Music & Musicians
Samson, Valerie, "Interview with Douglas Leedy 1974" EAR (magazine), vol. 4 no. 4, April 1976. 
Strange, Allan, Electronic Music (includes the score to Leedy's Entropical Paradise with Birdcall);
Wolf, Daniel: "Landmarks (11)"
Wolf, Daniel: "Leedy: The Leaves Be Green" (secondary URL)
Source: Music of the Avant Garde (includes the score to Leedy's Usable Music I for very small instruments with holes);
Scores published by Fallen Leaf Press, Schirmer, MaterialPress.Com

External links
 

Microtonal musicians
20th-century classical composers
21st-century classical composers
1938 births
2015 deaths
Musicians from Portland, Oregon
Pupils of Pran Nath (musician)
21st-century American composers
American male classical composers
American classical composers
20th-century American composers
20th-century American male musicians
21st-century American male musicians
Pomona College alumni
University of California, Berkeley alumni
Classical musicians from Oregon